Kinesin family member 5B (KIF5B) is a protein that in humans is encoded by the KIF5B gene.

Interactions 

KIF5B has been shown to interact with:
 KLC1,
 KLC2, 
 SNAP-25, 
 SNAP23,  and
 YWHAH.

References

Further reading

External links 
 

Human genes
Human proteins
Motor proteins